Uhtjärve is a village in Antsla Parish, Võru County in Estonia. As of the 2021 census, the population was 71.

Uhtjärve has an area of 8.559 km² and a Population Density [2021] of 8.295/km².

References

Villages in Võru County